The High Commission of India in Nicosia is the diplomatic mission of India to Cyprus. The high commissioner is Madhumita Hazarika Bhagat. India doesn't recognise Northern Cyprus, and instead uses its mission to cover the range in its jurisdiction.

Activities and events
Various activities are organised as well. The embassy offers educational programs and scholarships for the diasporan community.

See also
 Cyprus–India relations
 Foreign relations of Cyprus
 Foreign relations of India
 List of diplomatic missions in Cyprus
 List of diplomatic missions of India

References

External links
 
 Scholarship Programme for Diaspora Children (SPDC)

Cyprus
India
Cyprus–India relations
Buildings and structures in Nicosia